The 143rd meridian east of Greenwich is a line of longitude that extends from the North Pole across the Arctic Ocean, Asia, the Pacific Ocean, Australasia, the Indian Ocean, the Southern Ocean, and Antarctica to the South Pole.

The 143rd meridian east forms a great circle with the 37th meridian west.

From Pole to Pole
Starting at the North Pole and heading south to the South Pole, the 143rd meridian east passes through:

{| class="wikitable plainrowheaders"
! scope="col" width="130" | Co-ordinates
! scope="col" | Country, territory or sea
! scope="col" | Notes
|-
| style="background:#b0e0e6;" | 
! scope="row" style="background:#b0e0e6;" | Arctic Ocean
| style="background:#b0e0e6;" |
|-
| 
! scope="row" | 
| Sakha Republic — Kotelny Island, New Siberian Islands
|-
| style="background:#b0e0e6;" | 
! scope="row" style="background:#b0e0e6;" | East Siberian Sea
| style="background:#b0e0e6;" | Sannikov Strait
|-
| 
! scope="row" | 
| Sakha Republic — Great Lyakhovsky Island, New Siberian Islands
|-
| style="background:#b0e0e6;" | 
! scope="row" style="background:#b0e0e6;" | East Siberian Sea
| style="background:#b0e0e6;" | Laptev Strait
|-valign="top"
| 
! scope="row" | 
| Sakha Republic Khabarovsk Krai — from 
|-
| style="background:#b0e0e6;" | 
! scope="row" style="background:#b0e0e6;" | Sea of Okhotsk
| style="background:#b0e0e6;" |
|-
| 
! scope="row" | 
| Sakhalin Oblast — island of Sakhalin
|-
| style="background:#b0e0e6;" | 
! scope="row" style="background:#b0e0e6;" | Sea of Okhotsk
| style="background:#b0e0e6;" |
|-
| 
! scope="row" | 
| Sakhalin Oblast — island of Sakhalin
|-
| style="background:#b0e0e6;" | 
! scope="row" style="background:#b0e0e6;" | Sea of Okhotsk
| style="background:#b0e0e6;" |
|-
| 
! scope="row" | 
| Hokkaidō Prefecture — island of Hokkaidō
|-valign="top"
| style="background:#b0e0e6;" | 
! scope="row" style="background:#b0e0e6;" | Pacific Ocean
| style="background:#b0e0e6;" | Passing just west of Aua Island,  (at ) Passing just east of Wuvulu Island,  (at )
|-
| 
! scope="row" | 
|
|-valign="top"
| style="background:#b0e0e6;" | 
! scope="row" style="background:#b0e0e6;" | Coral Sea
| style="background:#b0e0e6;" | Torres Strait — passing amongst the Torres Strait Islands, Queensland, 
|-valign="top"
| 
! scope="row" | 
| Queensland New South Wales — from  Victoria — from 
|-
| style="background:#b0e0e6;" | 
! scope="row" style="background:#b0e0e6;" | Indian Ocean
| style="background:#b0e0e6;" | Australian authorities consider this to be part of the Southern Ocean
|-
| style="background:#b0e0e6;" | 
! scope="row" style="background:#b0e0e6;" | Southern Ocean
| style="background:#b0e0e6;" |
|-
| 
! scope="row" | Antarctica
| Australian Antarctic Territory, claimed by 
|-
|}

See also
142nd meridian east
144th meridian east

References

e143 meridian east